The Sumgayit FK 2022–23 season is Sumgayit's twelfth Azerbaijan Premier League season, and thirteenth season in their history.

Season events
On 21 September, Alyaksey Baha left his role as Head Coach buy mutual consent, with Samir Abbasov being appointed as his replacement on 26 September.

On 27 October, Sumgayit announced the signing of Richard Gadze on a contract until the end of the 2023–24 season.

On 23 December, Sumgayit announced the signing of Terrence Tisdell from Botoșani until the summer of 2024.

On 12 January, Sumgayit announced the signing of Diego Carioca on loan from Kolos Kovalivka until the end of the season.

On 14 January, Sumgayit announced the signing of Masaki Murata from Valmiera until the summer of 2024.

On 24 January, Sumgayit announced the signing of Karim Abubakar from Bnei Yehuda on a contract until the summer of 2023, with an option for an additional year.

Squad

Transfers

In

Loans in

Released

Friendlies

Competitions

Overview

Premier League

Results summary

Results by round

Results

League table

Azerbaijan Cup

Squad statistics

Appearances and goals

|-
|colspan="14"|Players away on loan:
|-
|colspan="14"|Players who left Sumgayit during the season:

|}

Goal scorers

Clean sheets

Disciplinary record

References

External links 
 Official Website

Sumgayit FK seasons
Azerbaijani football clubs 2022–23 season